Scavenger is an organism that seeks and feeds on discarded or abandoned material such as carrion or detritus.

Scavenger(s) or Scavenging may also refer to:

Film and TV
Scavengers (2013 film), science fiction film 
The Scavengers (1959 film), a Filipino crime film 
The Scavengers (1969 film), a Western war drama and exploitation film 
List of Lego Ninjago: Masters of Spinjitzu episodes#"Scavengers"
Scavenger (Transformers), characters in the Transformers series
Scavengers, Walking Dead season 7
Scavenger (audio drama), a 2014 audio drama based on the television series Doctor Who
Scavengers (game show), a British game show

Games
Scavenger hunt, a game
Scavenger, Inc., a video game publisher

Music
The Scavengers, a New Zealand punk rock band from the 1970s

Albums
Scavenger (album), a 1991 album by The Walkabouts
Scavengers (album), a 2001 album by Calla
The Scavenger, a 1966 album by Nat Adderley

Profession or activity
Mule scavenger, an old profession whereby a person retrieves cotton from underneath a spinning machine
Waste picker, a person who picks recyclable elements from waste

Science and technology
Scavenger (chemistry), a method of removing impurities or other undesired chemicals from a mixture
Scavenger receptor (endocrinology)
Scavenger receptor (immunology), a group of pattern recognition receptors of the innate immune system
Scavenging (engine), automotive process of pushing exhausted gas-charge out of the cylinder and drawing in fresh air
CPU scavenging, salvaging of machine time
Energy harvesting also called energy scavenging, the capturing energy for autonomous devices

Other uses
Scavenger (comics), an armored enemy of Aquaman
Operation Scavenger, a World War II operation in the Pacific theater
Scavenger's daughter, a rack-like torture instrument

See also
SCVNGR, a social location-based gaming platform for mobile phones